Steph Green (born 1979)  is an American film and television director, screenwriter, and executive producer best known for her work on The Book of Boba Fett (2022), Run & Jump (2013), and New Boy (2007).

Career 
Born in 1979 in San Francisco, she studied film in Ireland. She started her career as Spike Jonze's assistant on commercials, she then began directing numerous commercials of her own, including the IKEA advert "Cover Up", which received an award at the 2006 Cannes Film Festival.

In 2007, Green began her film career by directing and scripting the short New Boy. In 2013, she directed and wrote the screenplay for Run & Jump. In 2016, she directed episodes for American Gothic, Scandal, and The Americans. In 2017, she helmed episodes on Billions, American Crime, Preacher, Bates Motel, and You're the Worst.

The following year, she directed episodes on The Man in the High Castle, For the People, Luke Cage, The Deuce, and Strange Angel. In 2019, she helmed episodes of Watchmen, Dare Me, and The L Word: Generation Q. In 2022, she gained notability from directing an episode of The Book of Boba Fett. In 2023, she directed and executive produced several episodes of the upcoming series Duster.

Filmography

Accolade(s) 
In 2009, New Boy received a nomination at the 81st Academy Awards for Best Live Action Short Film. The film also received nominations at the Foyle Film Festival, Irish Film & Television Academy, Tribeca Film Festival, and Vail Film Festival. In 2020, the Watchmen episode "Little Fear of Lightning" received a nomination at the 72nd Primetime Emmy Awards for Outstanding Directing for a Limited Series, Movie or Dramatic Special.

References

External links 
 
 

1979 births
21st-century American women writers
American film directors
American television directors
American women television directors
Living people
Place of birth missing (living people)